The Critics' Choice Movie Award for Best Makeup is one of the awards given to people working in the motion picture industry by the Broadcast Film Critics Association. It was first given out in 2009.

Winners and nominees

2000s
2009: District 9
 Avatar
 Nine
 The Road
 Star Trek

2010s2010: Alice in Wonderland Black Swan
 Harry Potter and the Deathly Hallows – Part 1
 True Grit2011: Harry Potter and the Deathly Hallows – Part 2 Albert Nobbs
 J. Edgar
 My Week with Marilyn
 The Iron Lady2012: Cloud Atlas The Hobbit: An Unexpected Journey
 Les Misérables
 Lincoln2013: American Hustle 12 Years a Slave
 The Butler
 The Hobbit: The Desolation of Smaug
 Rush2014: Guardians of the Galaxy Foxcatcher
 The Hobbit: The Battle of the Five Armies
 Into the Woods
 Maleficent2015: Mad Max: Fury Road Black Mass
 Carol
 The Danish Girl
 The Hateful Eight
 The Revenant2016: Jackie Doctor Strange
 Fantastic Beasts and Where to Find Them
 Hacksaw Ridge
 Star Trek Beyond2017: Darkest Hour Beauty and the Beast
 I, Tonya
 The Shape of Water
 Wonder2018: ViceBlack Panther
Bohemian Rhapsody
The Favourite
Mary Queen of Scots
Suspiria2019: Bombshell Dolemite Is My Name
 The Irishman
 Joker
 Judy
 Once Upon a Time in Hollywood
 Rocketman

2020s2020: Ma Rainey's Black Bottom Emma
 Hillbilly Elegy
 Mank
 Promising Young Woman
 The United States vs. Billie Holiday2021: The Eyes of Tammy Faye Cruella
 Dune
 House of Gucci
 Nightmare Alley2022: Elvis' Babylon The Batman Black Panther: Wakanda Forever Everything Everywhere All at Once The Whale''

References

M
Film awards for makeup and hairstyling